Curiale is a surname. Notable people with the surname include:

Andrea Curiale, 16th-century Roman Catholic prelate
Davis Curiale (born 1987), Italian footballer
Joseph Curiale (born 1955), American composer, producer, arranger, and conductor

See also
Curiales